Mouzens may refer to two communes in France:

Mouzens, Dordogne, in the Dordogne département 
Mouzens, Tarn, in the Tarn département